Richard Odum Hart (December 13, 1927 – March 12, 2018) was an American lawyer and politician.

Hart was born in Benton, Illinois and graduated from Benton Consolidated High School in 1945. He served in the United States Navy in 1945 and 1946. Hart received his bachelor's degree in political science and economic from University of Illinois in 1951 and his law degree from Washington University School of Law in 1954. Hart was admitted to the Illinois bar in 1954 and practiced law in Benton, Illinois. He was also involved in the banking business. Hart served in the Illinois House of Representatives from 1969 to 1978 and was a Democrat. Hart died at Barnes-Jewish Hospital in St. Louis, Missouri.

Notes

1927 births
2018 deaths
People from Benton, Illinois
Military personnel from Illinois
Illinois lawyers
Businesspeople from Illinois
University of Illinois alumni
Washington University School of Law alumni
Democratic Party members of the Illinois House of Representatives